The New York and Atlantic Railway (NY&A)  is a short line railroad formed in 1997 to provide freight service over the tracks of the Long Island Rail Road, a public commuter rail agency which had decided to privatize its freight operations. An affiliate of the Anacostia and Pacific Company, NY&A  operates exclusively on Long Island, New York and is connected to the mainland via CSX's line over the Hell Gate Bridge. It also interchanges with New York New Jersey Rail's car float at the 65th Street Yard and US Rail of New York in Yaphank, New York. Its primary freight yard is Fresh Pond Junction in Queens. The NY&A officially took over Long Island Rail Road's freight operations on May 11, 1997. The initial franchise was for 20 years.

Operations
NYA serves about 80 customers. Lumber, building products, scrap metal, construction & demolition debris, bio-diesel fuel, food, beer, gravel, propane, chemicals, structural steel, plastics and recyclable cardboard/paper are NYA's main traffic. Occasionally, NYA transports utility poles and electrical transformers to the LIPA facility in Hicksville, which has its own spurs. NYA also moves municipal solid waste in sealed containers on COFC trains. NYA serves Belmont Park, delivering boxcars, usually BNSF's, full of feed for the race track's horses. For occasions such as the Super Bowl or St. Patrick's Day, the NYA transports 30 rail cars of beer per week, with each car holding 3,500 cases.

Some NYA customers are located off-line, and make use of NYA's team tracks to receive or ship products. Team tracks are located in Bay Ridge, Hicksville, Huntington, Greenlawn, St. James, Islip, Richmond Hill, Maspeth, Speonk, Medford, Southold, and elsewhere on the Long Island Rail Road (LIRR) lines that NYA serves. Most of NYA's customers have their own spurs, making the use of team tracks unnecessary. A new 28 acre, privately funded transload facility in Yaphank, Brookhaven Rail Terminal, opened in 2011.

In 2014, work was underway to build a transload facility for vegetable oil, food products and construction material at NYA's Wheel Spur Yard along Newtown Creek near Long Island City. NYA expects the facility to support construction of the replacement Kosciuszko Bridge. The yard reopened in 2015.

Other products shipped to Long Island via the NYA include bentonite and rock salt. NYA carries nearly 1 million tons of gravel a year from Connecticut quarries. The LIRR and the New York City Transit Authority occasionally receive new rail cars, and ship out old, retired equipment for scrapping by way of the Bay Ridge Branch.

Traffic
NYA moved 30,000 carloads in 2018, up from approximately 9,200 when it began operating in May 1997. The majority of its deliveries take place during the night, when fewer commuter trains are running.

About 15 percent of freight cars transported by the NYA are floated across New York Harbor from Jersey City to NYNJ Rails's railyard in Bay Ridge on the Brooklyn waterfront. The barge operation is managed by the Port Authority of New York and New Jersey, but the number of cars transferred to NYA by that method has been restricted by the use of only one aging barge that has a 14-car capacity. The Port Authority is adding two new barges, each with a capacity of 18 cars, and by 2023 the proposed cross-harbor tunnel is expected to transport 25,000 cars annually, up from 5,000 per year circa 2018.

Crewing
NYA has about 60 employees, including eight train crews. The railroad has substantially different crewing agreements than the Long Island Rail Road, allowing it more flexibility to match the needs of freight customers. NYA has two crewbases, one in Glendale, Queens and another near the former LIRR station Pine Aire on the main line, between Deer Park and Brentwood. On a typical weekday, NYA operates six crews.

Equipment
The NY&A operates thirteen locomotives. The roster, as of October 2017, includes the following:

Incidents

March 15, 2015 – 1 car of a NYAR train derailed while entering a siding at Wyandanch

July 8, 2015 – A NYAR freight train smashed into a tractor trailer after the crossing gates were slow going down in Maspeth, Queens; the truck driver escaped with minor injuries

September 15, 2015 – 2 cars of a 16-car NYAR freight train derailed, causing delays on the LIRR at Hicksville

June 17, 2021 - NYAR Train RS41, consisting of Locomotives 300 and 271, was rear ended by Long Island Rail Road Inspection Car TC82 east of the Cold Spring Harbor station. Minor injuries were reported by crew members of both trains

Gallery

See also

 Rail freight transportation in New York City and Long Island

Notes

References

External links
 New York and Atlantic Railway official site

New York (state) railroads
Companies affiliated with the Long Island Rail Road
Rail freight transportation in New York City
Railroads on Long Island
Railway companies established in 1997
1997 establishments in New York (state)